This is a recap of the 1959 season for the Professional Bowlers Association (PBA) Tour.  It was the tour's first season, following the incorporation of the PBA in 1958. It consisted of three events, all east of the Mississippi.

Tournament schedule

The PBA tour's first event, the $16,500 Empire State PBA open, was held at Schade's Academy, in Albany, New York. The first day of PBA competition was Friday, May 22, 1959. The competition ran until Sunday, May 24. 28 bowlers cashed in this competition. Lou Campi, of Dumont, New Jersey, won the first PBA event and took home the first prize of $2,500. 

The tour then rolled along to Paramus, New Jersey for the Paramus Eastern PBA Open from Thursday, May 28, 1959 to Saturday, May 30, 1959. Dick Weber began a long history of PBA success by winning his first title and $2,500 at Paramus Bowl.

After a layoff of several months, the PBA tour held its final event of the season at Bar-Jan Bowl in Dayton, Ohio. The event ran from September 10 to September 13. Weber became the first multiple champion on tour with his second title and a $2,600 prize.

Leading money winners

External links
1959 Season Schedule

Professional Bowlers Association seasons
1959 in bowling